The 1965 Boston University Terriers football team was an American football team that represented Boston University as an independent during the 1965 NCAA University Division football season. In its second season under head coach Warren Schmakel, the team compiled a 5–3–1 record, scored 140 points, and gave up 140 points.

Schedule

References

Boston University
Boston University Terriers football seasons
Boston University Terriers football